John Warner (born December 3, 1952) is an American comic book writer and editor, known for his stories of horror and the supernatural. He lists as his influences Arthur Rackham, N.C. Wyeth, Gerry Anderson, Maxfield Parrish, Chuck Jones, Jay Ward, Ray Bradbury, and Jorge Luis Borges.
 
Warner's most prolific period in the comic book field was from 1973 to 1979. During that time, he wrote many issues of  Gold Key Comics' Dark Shadows, as well as assorted fill-ins for Marvel Comics, DC Comics, and Warren Publishing.

Biography
From 1975 to 1978, Warner served as an editor and writer for Marvel's line of black-and-white magazines, where he worked primarily on Deadly Hands of Kung Fu, but also on Doc Savage, Marvel Preview, and Rampaging Hulk. For the latter series he created the characters Killer Shrike and the Modular Man. Separately, he co-created Ulysses Bloodstone. During his stint as a Marvel/Curtis editor, Warner hired Ralph Macchio, who later went on to a long-running career at Marvel.

In addition, Warner wrote most of the run of Marvel's Son of Satan, and in the late 1970s wrote Gold Key's Flash Gordon comic.

Notes

References

 Bio in Creepy #51 (Warren Publishing, Mar. 1973).

1952 births
Living people
American comics writers
Comic book editors